The North Shropshire Chronicle is no longer printed. It was a local weekly newspaper covering northern Shropshire in England, including Wem, Whitchurch, Ellesmere and many surrounding villages.

The North Shropshire Chronicle had been an edition of the Shrewsbury Chronicle for many years but it did not have its own totally separate front and news pages until 1999. It was printed on Wednesday evening and was on sale or distributed on Thursday.

See also
Shrewsbury Chronicle
Shropshire Star
Express & Star
Midland News Association

References

External links
northshropshirechronicle.com

Newspapers published in Shropshire
Mass media in Shropshire